Lemmi is the headquarters of the Pakke-Kessang district in the state of Arunachal Pradesh in India.

References 

Pakke-Kessang district
Villages in Pakke-Kessang district